Scott Nicholson (born 1963) is an American author specializing in horror or thrillers, often set in rural Appalachia. His debut, The Red Church, was a finalist for the Bram Stoker Award.

Thank you for the Flowers

The anthology Thank you for the Flowers was a collection of 13 short stories in which Nicholson merges "the macabre with science fiction and fantasy tales loaded with everything from biting satire to fluffy sentamentalism." In a review in The Dispatch, some of Nicholson's work constituted "a seeming glorification of metaphor". This collection featured the award-winning short story Vampire Shortstop.

Nicholson wrote stories that were included in Eden Studios's zombie anthologies edited by James Lowder.

The Farm

Nicholson's book The Farm was his fifth thriller, and was based around his experiences near his home in North Carolina. In an interview with The Times News, Nicholson noted that his fascination with Appalachian religions and goats influenced him in the writing of the book. In the article, Nicholson was quoted as saying:

"The core of the story is the relationship between the mother and daughter," Nicholson said. "Then these weird things start happening because she was into drugs. I kinda wanted her to be an outsider coming in to the little mountain community, being rebellious, going overboard, being really defiant so she could stand out. Because she's so weird she doesn't think anyone will believe her when things start happening with the goats. ... The situation is pulling them apart instead of drawing them together to deal with it."

They Hunger

In an interview with The Times News Nicholson described the book as "Deliverance with vampires".

After and Next

After is a post-apocalyptic series. A massive solar storm erases the world's technological infrastructure and kills billions. While the remaining humans are struggling to adapt and survive, they notice that some among them have changed. The Next series is a sequel in the same world, 5 years later.

Prizes

 1999 – Vampire Shortstop won the Writers of the Future L. Ron Hubbard Gold Award.

Bibliography

Novels
 The Red Church, 2002
 The Harvest, 2003
 The Manor, 2004
 The Home, 2005
 The Farm, 2006
 They Hunger, 2007
 Disintegration, 2010
 Drummer Boy, sequel to Red Church, 2010
 After #1 : The Shock, 2014
 After #2 : The Echo, 2014
 After #3 : Milepost 291, 2014
 After #4 : Whiteout, 2014
 After #5 : Red Scare, 2015
 After #6 : Dying Light, 2015
 Next #1 : Afterburn, 2015
 Next #2 : Earth Zero, 2016
 Next #3 : Radiophobia, 2016
 Next #4 : Directive 17, 2016
 Next #5 : Crucible, 2016
 Next #6 : Half Life, 2017

Novellas
 After #0 : First Light, 2014

Short stories
 Scattered Ashes, 2008-Collection
 Thank You For the Flowers, 2000 – story collection
 "Heal Thyself" – appeared in the anthology Aegri Somnia
 "Unnatural Disasters", 2011-Collection

Comics
 Dirt, (forthcoming) 2009-Comic series

References

External links
 authorscottnicholson 

American horror writers
Living people
American thriller writers
Place of birth missing (living people)
American male novelists
1963 births